The Kia K4 or  is a compact sedan positioned between the Kia K3 and Kia K5 that was designed exclusively for the Chinese market. The Kia K4 was previewed on the 2014 Beijing Auto Show by the Kia K4 Concept.

The production version of the Kia K4 shares the same platform as the Hyundai Mistra, and was launched on to the Chinese car market in the second half of 2014 and was unveiled in August 2014, at the 2014 Chengdu Auto Show. The market launch for the production Kia K4 was in October 2014.

2018 facelift
A facelift was revealed in 2018 called the Kia K4 Cachet featuring new front and rear end styling.

References

External links

K4
Compact cars
Sedans
Front-wheel-drive vehicles
Cars introduced in 2014
2010s cars
Cars of China